The 2002 West Virginia Mountaineers football team completed the regular season with a 9–3 record and traveled to the Continental Tire Bowl, where they lost to the Virginia Cavaliers 48–22. They finished with a record of 9-4 and a ranking of 25/20.

WVU's 9–4 record marked the biggest one-season turnaround in Big East Conference history, after posting a 3–8 record the previous season.

Schedule

Roster

2002 season
Rasheed Marshall was the starting quarterback for the Mountaineers. He led the team with 1616 passing yards and 9 touchdowns. Leading the team in rushing was Avon Cobourne with 1710 net yards. Miquelle Henderson led the team in receiving with 40 receptions for 496 yards.

The home opener for the West Virginia Mountaineers was against Chattanooga, in which the Mountaineers won handily 56–7. In the second game of the season, WVU played at Wisconsin, where they lost 34–17. They then traveled to Cincinnati, where they beat the Bearcats 35–32.

They then defeated East Carolina by a 37–17 margin at home. They got demolished at home by ACC powerhouse Maryland 17–48. They then traveled to Rutgers, where they won handily 40–0. The next game was a 34–17 home win over Syracuse.

They played host to the number 1 team in the land, the Miami Hurricanes, but lost by a 23–40 count. They played at Temple, and blew out the Owls 46–20. A home game against Boston College resulted in a 24–14 Mountaineer victory. Their next game was against Virginia Tech, where they won 21–18, in Blacksburg.

On November 30, they played at archrival Pitt in the Backyard Brawl, and won 24–17. In the Continental Tire Bowl, they lost to the Virginia Cavaliers 22–48 to finish the season.

Team players in the NFL

References

West Virginia
West Virginia Mountaineers football seasons
West Virginia Mountaineers football